Swakopmund FC is a Namibian football club based in Swakopmund which currently plays in the First Division, the second-tier competition in the country. The team plays its home matches at the SFC-Stadion.

History 
The club was founded in 1929 by German colonists and is still owned and supported by Germans and German clubs. In the past Schalke, Hertha Berlin, and VfL Wolfsburg have provided financial support.

The senior team earned promotion to the First Division for the first time for the 2009/10 season. In October 2018 SFC again earned promotion to the First Division. In May 2021 Namibian international and Blackburn Rovers player Ryan Nyambe held a two-day training camp at the club.

Honours 
Second Division (Erongo): 2017/2018

Notable former players 
 Deon Hotto

References

External links 
Official website
Global Sports Archive profile

Football clubs in Namibia